William Milton Garfield (October 26, 1867 –  December 16, 1941) was a pitcher in Major League Baseball who played for the Pittsburgh Alleghenys in  and the Cleveland Spiders in . Listed at 5' 11.5", 160 lb., Garfield batted and threw right-handed. He was born in Sheffield, Ohio.
 
In a two-season career, Garfield posted a 1-9 record with a 5.73 ERA in 13 appearances, including nine complete games, giving up 99 runs (63 earned) on 136 hits and 52 walks while striking out 29 in 99 innings of work. 
 
Garfield died in Danville, Illinois, at the age of 74.

See also
1889 Pittsburgh Alleghenys season
1890 Cleveland Spiders season

External links
Baseball Reference
Retrosheet

Cleveland Spiders players
Pittsburgh Alleghenys players
19th-century baseball players
Major League Baseball pitchers
Baseball players from Ohio
Oberlin Yeomen baseball players
1867 births
1941 deaths
Springfield Senators players
Toledo Black Pirates players
Oakland Colonels players
Ishpeming-Nagaunee Unions players
Sandusky Sandies players
People from Lorain County, Ohio